Ham Chot Khwai  (ห้ามจอดควาย) was the tenth album by Thai rock band Carabao. It was released in 1990.

Track listing

1990 albums
Carabao (band) albums